The Canadian Journal of Zoology is a peer-reviewed scientific journal that covers zoology. It was established in 1951 as the continuation of Canadian Journal of Research, Section D: Zoological Sciences, and is associated with the Canadian Society of Zoologists.

Abstracting and indexing
The journal is abstracted and/or indexed in:

References

External links

Zoology journals
Monthly journals
Publications established in 1951
Multilingual journals
Canadian Science Publishing academic journals
Academic journals associated with learned and professional societies of Canada